Attorney General Bryant may refer to:

Michael Bryant (politician) (born 1966), Attorney General of Ontario
Winston Bryant (born 1938), Attorney General of Arkansas